Ahmad Idham bin Ahmad Nadzri (born January 1, 1978) is Malaysian actor, film director and producer of television and film, known for the role of acting and directing. He was a former CEO of the National Film Development Corporation Malaysia (FINAS) from March 2019 to September 2021.

Personal life
Idham was born and raised in Alor Setar, Kedah and is the eldest son in the family. He has two younger brothers, Khalid and Azman and a younger sister, Arbaiyah also known as Abby. Idham holds the Bachelor's Degree in Accountancy at the Universiti Teknologi MARA (UiTM).

In September 2020, he successfully completed his Doctor of Philosophy studies at Universiti Utara Malaysia and obtained a Doctor of Philosophy approval in the field of Management. He made a thesis entitled 'Malaysian Film Industry Ecosystem and Policy: A Study on the Internationalization of Malay Films.

Idham marries Jameah "Amy" Aziz in 1999 and have four children. His oldest son, Ahmad Firdaus has had autism since birth. He established a special school named after his son, with an international system of education and therapy available to disabled people, named Eden Firdaus Special Need Center located in the Encorp Strand Mall, Kota Damansara.

Filmography

Film

Television series

Telemovie

References

External links
 

1978 births
Living people
Malaysian film actors
Malaysian film directors
Malaysian producers
Malaysian screenwriters
Malaysian male actors
Malaysian television actors
Malaysian people of Malay descent
Malaysian Muslims
People from Alor Setar
People from Kedah